Tomistoma is a genus of gavialid crocodilians.  They are noted for their long narrow snouts used to catch fish, similar to the gharial.  Tomistoma contains one extant (living) member, the false gharial (Tomistoma schlegelii), as well as potentially several extinct species: T. cairense, T. lusitanicum, T. taiwanicus, T. coppensi, and T. dowsoni. However, these species may need to be reclassified to different genera as studies have shown them to be paraphyletic.

Unlike the gharial, the false gharial's snout broadens considerably towards the base and so is more similar to those of true crocodiles than the gharial, whose osteology indicated a distinct lineage from all other living crocodilians. However, although more morphologically similar to Crocodylidae based on skeletal features, recent molecular studies using DNA sequencing consistently indicate that the false gharial and by inference other related extinct forms traditionally viewed as belonging to the crocodylian subfamily Tomistominae actually belong to Gavialoidea and Gavialidae.

Fossils of extinct Tomistoma species have been found in deposits of Paleogene, Neogene, and Quaternary ages in Taiwan, Uganda, Italy, Portugal, Egypt and India, but nearly all of them are likely to be distinct genera due to older age compared to the false gharial.

The below cladogram of the major living crocodile groups is based on molecular studies and shows the false gharial's close relationships:

Here is a more detailed cladogram from a 2018 tip dating study by Lee & Yates simultaneously using morphological, molecular (DNA sequencing), and stratigraphic (fossil age) data that shows the false gharial's proposed placement within Gavialidae, including extinct members:

References

Gavialidae
Reptile genera
Reptile genera with one living species
Taxa named by Salomon Müller